The scotch bonnet is a variety of chili pepper.

Scotch bonnet may also refer to:

 Scotch bonnet (mushroom), a mushroom also known as the fairy ring mushroom
 Scotch bonnet (sea snail), a sea snail and the official state shell of North Carolina
 Scotch Bonnet Island, a one hectare island in Lake Ontario
 Scotch Bonnet Records, a Scottish record label
 Scotch Bonnet Ridge, a geologic feature in Canada and the United States, near Scotch Bonnet Island

See also
 Tam o' shanter (cap), after which the above are named